Trabboch is a hamlet in East Ayrshire, Scotland. Built as a miners village in the 1880s, it was owned and leased by Wm. Baird & Co., Ltd. and at one time had 94 dwellings. The miners rows stood, until demolition in 1969, on the Stair and Littlemill road, about two miles south of Stair, in that parish. The name is locally pronounced 'Traaboch'.

History

Etymology
The name Trabboch was first attested in 1303 as Trebathe, and it has a Brittonic origin. The first part of the name is the element treβ-, denoting a habitation and the land associated with it (Welsh tref "a town", traditionally "a farm"). The second element could be either -*bedu meaning "birch trees" (Welsh bedw), or -*beδ, "a grave" (Welsh bedd). The present form shows influence from the Gaelic element beitheach meaning "of birches". Trabeattie, near Torthorwald in Dumfrieshire may have the same etymology.

The Village and coal mines
The mining settlement was made up of four rows, one of 40 and three of 18 houses each, with a population of around 430. The Trabboch pit closed in 1908 and the Drumdow pit closed a few years later. Nearby Trabboch House was home to the proprietor of the coal pits. The workings form a sizeable new 'loch' and the waste material bings are still a prominent feature. Many of the villagers were moved to Drongan when the miners rows were demolished.

After the closure of the local mines for a time some of the miners caught the train to Skares where they worked at Whitehill Colliery whilst others found work at Burnockhill Colliery that was located in the locality.

Stair school
Stair school opened in 1863 and was located in Trabboch, it always served as the Village Hall and later served as the Stair Community Centre. The school became a Junior Secondary with as many as 150-200 pupils, closing its doors in 1969, Miss Brown being the last headteacher.

Trabboch Castle and Barony

The hamlet is also known for the old castle in the area, Trabboch Castle. The lands of Trabboch are first recorded by name in a rental of 1303–4. King Robert the Bruce gave the castle to the Boyds of Kilmarnock for services rendered at the Battle of Bannockburn. By 1451 the lands had passed into the hands of William, Earl of Douglas and later to the Boswells of Auchinleck. In the 17th century Chalmers of Gadgirth and Reid of Barskimming held parts of the Barony of Trabboch. The associated Mill of Trabboch stood on the Water of Coyle and was not powered by the loch waters. Trabboch Mains is a farm that was built mainly using stone taken from the nearby Trabboch Castle.

Trabboch Station

Trabboch railway station was situated on the Ayr and Cumnock Branch of the Glasgow and South Western Railway. The station was originally part of the Ayr and Cumnock Branch on the Glasgow and South Western Railway. The station opened in 1872, and closed on 10 September 1951.

The Trabboch Lochs
Trabboch Loch is nearby, formed from the flooded mineworkings of Drumdow Colliery in the late 19th century. The Loch of Trabboch was an ancient glacial loch, later a curling pond and the remnant is a wetland, important for birdlife.

The Shaw Kirk or Stair Free Church
The Schaw or Shaw Kirk is now ruinous (2011) having been built in 1843-4 close to the Shaw Burn on the parish boundary and abandoned in 1956 when a new church was built in Drongan following the demolition of the miner's rows and the transfer of the inhabitants to Drongan. It was expanded in the 1890s with an attractive wooden porch added and a new wing built o the east making it cross shaped. Two associated buildings stood to the north where the entrance to the nearby business now runs. Its final use was as a store for a local farm. The manse still stands as a private house on the road running up to Trabboch Burn.

Micro-history
An SS Trabboch was sunk in 1914 by the German Light Cruiser Emden in the Indian Ocean.

References

 Notes

 Sources
 Adamson, Archibald R. (1879). Rambles through the Land of Burns. Kilmarnock : Dunlop & Drennan.
 Barber, Derek (2000). Steps through Stair. Stair Parish Church. 
 Campbell, Thorbjørn (2003). Ayrshire. A Historical Guide. Edinburgh : Birlinn. .
 Coventry, Martin (2010). Castles of the Clans. Musselburgh : Goblinshead. .
 Love, Dane (2003). Ayrshire : Discovering a County. Ayr : Fort Publishing. .
 Love, Dane (2016). Ayrshire's Lost Villages. Auchinleck : Carn Publishing. .
 Paterson, James (1863–66). History of the Counties of Ayr and Wigton. V. 2 - Part 2 - Kyle. Edinburgh: J. Stillie.

External links

 Video footage of Trabboch railway station site
 Video footage of the old Trabboch Village site
 Video footage and narration - Free Church of Stair
 Memories of Trabboch
 Clan boyd and Trabboch Castle

Villages in East Ayrshire
Castles in East Ayrshire
Lochs of East Ayrshire